The following is a list of Marist Red Foxes men's basketball head coaches. The Red Foxes have had 8 coaches in their 40-season history across Division I. The team is currently coached by John Dunne.

References

Marist
Marist Red Foxes basketball head coaches